Rozkoš Reservoir is a reservoir in the Hradec Králové Region of the Czech Republic. It is the eight largest reservoir in the country.

Location

Rozkoš is located in the Hradec Králové Region and is the largest body of water in the region. It is nicknamed "East Bohemian Sea". The town of Česká Skalice is situated on its shore. Apart from Česká Skalice, the reservoir also extends into the municipal territories of Velká Jesenice, Provodov-Šonov and Nahořany. From the geomorphological point of view, Rozkoš lies in the Orlice Table.

Characteristics

History
The construction of the reservoir near Česká Skalice was considered as early as 1923. In 1939, a general project was drawn up, according to which preparations took place in the years 1946–1950. The building of the reservoir dam began in 1951, however after one year of construction, further works were halted. The construction of the dam was resumed in 1965 and completed in 1972. Permission for permanent operation was granted by the Ministry of Forestry and Water Management on 1 January 1976.

Purpose
Rozkoš serves the flood protection of the lower course of the Úpa and Metuje Rivers and as retention basin, and is also used for summer recreation, water sports and for the breeding of fish. A small hydroelectric power plant with installed capacity 675 kW is located on the main dam. The reservoir is also an important ornithological site with more than 270 species of birds, of which more than 120 species nest here.

Near Česká Skalice is located Campsite Rozkoš.

References

External links

Rozkoš official profile on the website of its administrator Povodí Labe

Reservoirs in the Czech Republic
Hradec Králové Region